James Holley Douglas (born June 21, 1951) is an American politician from the state of Vermont. A Republican, he served the 80th governor of Vermont from 2003 to 2011. On August 27, 2009, Douglas announced that he would not seek re-election for a fifth term in 2010. He left the office in January 2011.

On January 6, 2011, Douglas became an executive in residence at Middlebury College where he taught a 24 student course titled Vermont Government and Politics.  Douglas is the interim director of the Vermont Historical Society.

Douglas currently serves on the Governors’ Council of the Bipartisan Policy Center in Washington, DC.

Early career
Douglas was born in the city of Springfield, Massachusetts. In 1968, he graduated from East Longmeadow High School in the town of East Longmeadow, Massachusetts. He graduated with a Bachelor of Arts degree from Middlebury College in Middlebury, Vermont, where he had been active in the College Republicans, eventually becoming chairman. At Middlebury College, Douglas was a Russian studies major. Vermont maintained a sister-state relationship with the Republic of Karelia, Russia until it was broken by Governor Phil Scott in March of 2022 as protest against the ongoing Russian invasion of Ukraine.  While influenced by Douglas, this relationship was started in 1991 under the governorship of Madeline Kunin.

In November 1972, Douglas was elected to the Vermont House of Representatives, where he became the House Majority Leader during his third two-year term at the age of 25. He left the Vermont General Assembly in 1979, afterwards serving as a top aide to Governor Richard A. Snelling. Douglas was elected Secretary of State in November 1980, a post which he held until 1992. That year he sought election to the U.S. Senate, but was defeated by Democratic incumbent Patrick Leahy.

Vermont State Treasurer
During his tenure as Vermont State Treasurer, Democrat Paul W. Ruse Jr. was criticized for being too friendly with financial services firms that had an interest in matters handled by the state treasurer, including accepting campaign contributions from them, and appearing in an advertisement for one.  Because of the controversy, in 1994 Ruse decided not to run for reelection.  This decision was not widely known; Ruse stated that he withheld his decision not to run so that Ed Flanagan, the incumbent Vermont State Auditor, would not run for treasurer.  Flanagan and Ruse had been involved in a behind the scenes dispute over details of an auditor's report about the treasurer's office; Flanagan disclaimed any interest in the treasurer's post.

As a result of Ruse's decision not to run again, only Douglas had filed as a major party candidate for treasurer; in the absence of a Democratic candidate, Douglas won the Democratic nomination by write in vote.  In the general election, Douglas faced only token opposition, and received over 91% of the votes.

Ruse's deputy had retired in October 1994.  After Douglas won the treasurer's election, Ruse offered him the deputy's position so that Douglas would have an opportunity to learn the workings of the treasurer's office.  Douglas accepted, and served as deputy state treasurer from November 1994 until beginning his term as treasurer in January 1995.  Douglas was reelected in 1996, 1998 and 2000.

Governor of Vermont

In the 2002 gubernatorial election to succeed five-term Governor Howard Dean, Douglas achieved a plurality over Democratic Lieutenant Governor Doug Racine, 45 to 42 percent. The Vermont constitution requires that the legislature select the governor if no candidate receives over 50 percent. The Vermont General Assembly almost always chooses the candidate who won a plurality, and Racine did not contest the results.  In January 2003, the legislature selected Douglas by a vote of 159 to 16. Douglas won reelection to a second two-year term in 2004, defeating Democrat Peter Clavelle, 59 to 38 percent.

In early 2005, Douglas announced that he would not run against Democratic-leaning independent Jim Jeffords in the 2006 Senate race. In April 2005, Jeffords announced that he would not seek re-election, which led to speculation that Douglas would throw his hat into the ring against Vermont independent Congressman Bernie Sanders, who had announced his candidacy for the seat. On April 30, Douglas announced again that he would not seek Jeffords' seat, and simultaneously announced that he would run for re-election for governor in 2006. Many pundits believed that Douglas was the only Republican who could possibly defeat Sanders, and his decision to run for governor effectively handed the open Senate seat to Sanders.  Douglas was re-elected governor with 57% of the vote over Democrat Scudder Parker.

On May 22, 2007, Governor Douglas signed a landmark civil rights bill banning discrimination on the basis of gender identity by employers, financial institutions, housing, public accommodations, and other contexts. After the Vermont Human Rights Commission recommended that Governor Douglas veto a similar bill in 2006, Douglas worked with legislators to craft a new bill in 2007.  This bill passed both chambers of the legislature with overwhelming bipartisan support.

Douglas decided to stand for re-election in 2008 and ran unopposed in the Republican primary on September 9, 2008. His principal challengers in the general election were Independent/Progressive Anthony Pollina, and Democrat Gaye Symington.  Douglas won a fourth term with nearly 54% of the vote. Although that was his lowest percentage since his initial narrow victory over Doug Racine, he bested his closest challenge, Pollina, by 32%.

Douglas became the first governor to meet with President Barack Obama in the White House on February 2, 2009. He also served as Chairman of the National Governors Association from 2009 to 2010.

On April 6, 2009, Douglas vetoed a bill allowing marriage for same-sex couples in Vermont. Democrats in the Vermont House and Senate overrode the veto with a supermajority the next day, marking the first time Douglas had been overridden during his tenure.

On June 2, 2009, Democrats in the Vermont House and Senate voted to override Douglas's veto of the Vermont state budget.

On August 27, 2009, Douglas announced that he would not seek re-election in 2010.

In early 2010, Douglas became the first American political leader to be appointed to the National Order of Quebec ("L'Ordre National du Quebec" in French), receiving the insignia of an Officer of the order from Premier Jean Charest at a ceremony at the National Assembly of Quebec.  He was recognized for strengthening Vermont's historical bonds with Quebec and making improved relations with the province a priority of his governorship.

On June 17, 2010, his approval rating stood at 65 percent.

Cabinet and administration

Post-gubernatorial career
Douglas was succeeded as Governor by Democrat Peter Shumlin.

After leaving office Douglas became an Executive in Residence at Middlebury College and authored a memoir, which was published in late 2012. On July 29, 2015, Douglas was named the interim director of the Vermont Historical Society.

Electoral history

Notes

External links
 Vermont Governor Jim Douglas official state website
 

|-

|-

|-

|-

|-

1951 births
Bipartisan Policy Center
College Republicans
Governors of Vermont
Living people
Members of the Vermont House of Representatives
Middlebury College alumni
Middlebury College faculty
Officers of the National Order of Quebec
Politicians from Springfield, Massachusetts
Republican Party governors of Vermont
Secretaries of State of Vermont
State treasurers of Vermont
United Church of Christ members
Vermont Republicans
Writers from Springfield, Massachusetts